Britain's Lost Masterpieces is a factual BBC Four documentary television series that aims to uncover overlooked art treasures in British public collections, in conjunction with Art UK. It is presented by Bendor Grosvenor, along with art historian Jacky Klein (series 1) and Emma Dabiri (series 1 to 5). The series also features the art restoration work of Simon Rollo Gillespie. In North American syndication, the series is called The Art Detectives.

Development
Each episode begins with Grosvenor locating a prospective masterpiece in the digitized collection of Art UK. The restoration work of Gillespie's shop is key to a successful attribution.

There was a minor controversy regarding similarities between Britain's Lost Masterpieces and the previous show Grosvenor was on, Fake or Fortune?

The COVID-19 pandemic delayed production of Series 5, planned for Spring 2020. Production resumed in October 2020, only for Grosvenor to catch COVID-19.

Episodes

Series 1 
Series one, comprising three episodes, was aired in September and October 2016.

Series 2 
Series two was aired in September and October 2017.

Series 3 
Series three was aired in August 2018.

Series 4 
Series four was aired in October and November 2019.

Series 5 
The first two episodes of Series five were aired in February 2021, followed by a third in February 2022.

References

External links 
 
 Guardian review
 Feature on the premiere

BBC television documentaries
Documentary television series about art
2016 British television series debuts
English-language television shows